Si Samrong is a district (amphoe) of Sukhothai Province in the lower north of Thailand.

Geography
Neighboring districts are (clockwise from the south) Mueang Sukhothai, Ban Dan Lan Hoi, Thung Saliam, and Sawankhalok of Sukhothai Province and Phrom Phiram of Phitsanulok province.

Its important water resource is the Yom River.

History
The district was renamed from Khlong Tan to Si Samrong in 1939.

Administration
The district is divided into 13 sub-districts (tambons), which are further subdivided into 137 villages (mubans). The township (thesaban tambon) Si Samrong covers tambon Wang Luek and parts of tambons Khlong Tan and Sam Ruean. There are a further 12 tambon administrative organizations (TAO).

References

External links
amphoe.com

Si Samrong